Infiniti QX may refer to any of the following SUV models:

 Infiniti QX4, mid-size luxury SUV
 Infiniti QX30, subcompact luxury crossover
 Infiniti QX50, compact luxury crossover
 Infiniti QX56, full-size luxury SUV
 Infiniti QX60, mid-size luxury crossover
 Infiniti QX70, mid-size luxury crossover
 Infiniti QX80, full-size luxury SUV

QX
Sport utility vehicles